Hammondsport is a village at the south end of Keuka Lake, in Steuben County, one of the Finger Lakes of New York, United States.

The Village of Hammondsport is in the Town of Urbana and is northeast of Bath.

History

Lazarus Hammond founded the village around 1827. The village was incorporated in 1856. The village later became a center for the New York wine industry.

The American motorcycle designer and manufacturer, and recognized expert on gasoline engines Glenn Hammond Curtiss resided at Hammondsport, where he was born in 1878. Early development of aircraft and seaplanes was carried out at Hammondsport by Curtiss who had joined with Alexander Graham Bell and others in the Aerial Experiment Association.

In 1921, five local men purchased a wood barrel factory just south of the present D.W. Putnam Wine Company, and named it the Aerial Service Corporation. Two of these men, Henry Kleckler, the president and William Chadeayne, vice president, were formerly with the Curtiss Aeroplane Company, founded by Curtiss. Today, this company is known as the Mercury Corporation.

Geography

Hammondsport is at the south end of Keuka Lake, north of the junction of New York State Route 54 and New York State Route 54A. NY-54A passes through the village after linking with County Road 76.

Keuka Inlet and Glen Brook flow past the village.

Demographics

At the 2000 census, there were 731 people, 332 households and 200 families residing in the village. The population density was 2,088.5 per square mile (806.4/km2). There were 388 housing units at an average density of 1,108.5 per square mile (428.0/km2). The racial makeup of the village was 96.58% White, 1.37% African American, 0.41% Native American, 0.41% Asian, 0.41% from other races, and 0.82% from two or more races. Hispanic or Latino of any race were 0.27% of the population.

There were 332 households, of which 27.1% had children under the age of 18 living with them, 44.3% were married couples living together, 13.3% had a female householder with no husband present, and 39.5% were non-families. 34.6% of all households were made up of individuals, and 14.8% had someone living alone who was 65 years of age or older. The average household size was 2.20 and the average family size was 2.83.

24.1% of the population were under the age of 18, 6.0% from 18 to 24, 24.4% from 25 to 44, 29.7% from 45 to 64, and 15.9% who were 65 years of age or older. The median age was 42 years. For every 100 females, there were 83.2 males. For every 100 females age 18 and over, there were 83.2 males.

The median household income was $38,182 and the family median income was $50,125. Males had a median income of $32,143 and females $28,906. The per capita income for the village was $18,308. About 4.6% of families and 5.8% of the population were below the poverty line, including 11.1% of those under age 18 and 3.5% of those aged 65 or over.

Additional information

One of Hammondsport's current wineries, the Pleasant Valley Wine Company, founded in 1860 and a mile southwest, was designated U.S. Bonded Winery No.1 and has eight remarkable stone buildings listed on the National Register of Historic Places.

The Great Western Winery and Visitor Center, the most comprehensive center of its kind in the world, is part of the same facilities. Displayed there are historical artifacts covering over 140 years of Finger Lakes winemaking and grape growing expertise, a working model of the Bath and Hammondsport Railroad, "The Champagne Trail" and the cooper's shop, showing authentic wine casks and barrels, cooper tools and equipment.

Hammondsport's other wineries include Bully Hill Vineyards, Dr. Konstantin Frank, Heron Hill Winery, and Chateau Renaissance Wine Cellars. Bully Hill Vineyards includes the Greyton H. Taylor Wine Museum.

The village is referred to as "The Cradle of Aviation" and is home to The Glenn H. Curtiss Museum, dedicated to the memory of the pioneer aviator and housing such exhibits as a full-scale replica of the first naval aircraft and many original planes and developed by Curtiss.

The modern-day Mercury Corporation is a privately held company having  of manufacturing facilities in New York, subsidiaries in Florida, North Carolina, Minnesota and Mexico, as well as alliance partnerships in Europe and Asia. It is one of the leading corporations involved in contract manufacturing, sheet metal fabrication and assembly, and plastic injection molding.

The village was served by the Bath & Hammondsport Railroad for many years. Although the tracks are still in place, railroad service has been discontinued.

Hammondsport is along the route of the Finger Lakes Trail, a scenic trail winding across central and western New York.

Much of the 1995 mockumentary Dadetown was filmed in and around Hammondsport.

In addition to Pleasant Valley Wine Company complex, other sites on the National Register of Historic Places are Germania Wine Cellars, Gold Seal Winery, Hammondsport Union Free School, Mallory Mill and the Pulteney Square Historic District.

Notable people
 Morris Brown, Jr., won a Medal of Honor for his actions in the American Civil War.
 Charles Champlin, film critic and writer, born in Hammondsport in 1926.
 Joseph M. Champlin, Roman Catholic priest, author and lecturer, born in Hammondsport in 1930.
 Glenn Curtiss, aviation pioneer, born 1878 in Hammondsport.
 John Randolph Kuhl, former Congressman, New York assemblyman and state senator, resides in Hammondsport.
 Meredith Mallory, former US Congressman

References

External links
  Village of Hammondsport official website

 
Villages in New York (state)
Curtiss-Wright Company
Populated places established in 1827
Villages in Steuben County, New York
1827 establishments in New York (state)